Peter McNeil (1854 – 30 March 1901) was a Scottish footballer and along with brother Moses, one of the founding members of Rangers Football Club. He made seven Scottish Cup appearances for the club.

Life
He was born at Belmore House in Rhu in Dunbartonshire, the son of John McNeil and his wife, Jane Loudon Bain. His father was the gardener at Belmore House. Around 1870 the family moved to 17 Cleveland Street in Anderston.

Peter McNeil was apprenticed as a clerk in Anderston around 1871.

He played in Rangers first ever match in May 1872 against another Glasgow team, Callander F.C. on Fleshers Haugh, Glasgow Green.

After finishing playing football, he continued as match secretary and was hugely influential in the fledgling years of the Club. McNeil died in 1901 at the Hawkhead Asylum near Paisley aged 47. He was certified insane and had been sectioned. The pressures from financial problems had taken its toll on his mental and physical health.

He is buried in Craigton Cemetery in southwest Glasgow.

Recognition
On 22 February 2010, Peter McNeil was inducted into the Rangers Hall of Fame.

Family
In 1885, he married Jeannie Fraser. They lived at 31 Rawcliffe Terrace in Pollokshields. In 1888, they moved to 37 Bentinck Street in the Kelvingrove district.

References

1854 births
1901 deaths
Scottish footballers
Rangers F.C. players
People from Rhu, Argyll and Bute
Association football midfielders
Sportspeople from Argyll and Bute